Theretra capensis is a moth of the family Sphingidae. It is known from woodland and open habitats from the Cape to Zimbabwe, Zambia, Democratic Republic of the Congo, Malawi, Mozambique and East Africa.

The length of the forewings is 44–52 mm. The body and forewings are pale greenish-brown, greyish-green, buff, or pale reddish brown, sometimes with a darker postmedial band. The hindwings are uniform rosy red.

The larvae feed on Vigna species.

References

Theretra
Moths described in 1764
Moths of Africa
Taxa named by Carl Linnaeus